Below is an incomplete list of diplomats from the United Kingdom to the Grand Duchy of Tuscany, specifically Heads of Missions.

Heads of Missions

Envoys Extraordinary 
Elizabeth I of England sent no envoys to Italy before 1600.
1600–1601: Lodowick Bryskett Special Ambassador
1603–1604: Sir Anthony Standen Special Ambassador
1604: Sir Michael Balfour Special Ambassador
1608–1609: Sir Stephen Lesieur Special Ambassador
No representation
1631–1633: Jerome Weston
No representation
1659–1664: Joseph Kent Agent
1661: George Digby, 2nd Earl of Bristol Special Ambassador
1665–1671: Sir John Finch Ambassador
1670: Viscount Fauconberg Ambassador Extraordinary
1670: Clement Cottrell Special Ambassador
1670: James Hamilton
1672: Sir Bernard Gascoigne in Florence during mission to Emperor of Germany
1678: Thomas Plott Agent
 1681–1689: Sir Thomas Dereham, Bt Minister Resident
 1689–1690: Sir Lambert Blackwell
1690–1697: No diplomatic relations Sir Lambert Blackwell resided at Leghorn as consul
1697–1705: Sir Lambert Blackwell
1704–1711 Dr Henry Newton
1710–1714: Hon. John Molesworth
1714–1722: Henry Davenant
1722–1724: Hon. John Molesworth Envoy to Savoy but residing in Tuscany 1722–1723 and treated as Plenipotentiary
1724–1733: Francis Colman Resident
1733–1734: Brinley Skinner (consul) Chargé d'affaires
1734–1739: Charles Fane

Envoys Extraordinary and Ministers Plenipotentiary
1740–1786: Sir Horace Mann, 1st Bt Chargé d'affaires 1738-1740; Minister 1740-1765; Envoy Extraordinary 1767-1782; Envoy Extraordinary and Plenipotentiary 1782-1786
 1786–1787: Sir Horace Mann, 2nd Bt Chargé d'affaires after his uncle's death
1787–1788: John Udney (Consul at Leghorn) Chargé d'affaires
1787: William Fawkener (pro tempore)
1787–1794: John Hervey, Lord Hervey
1794–1814: Hon. William Wyndham
1814–1818: John Fane, Lord Burghersh

Also to Parma, Modena and Lucca from 1818

1818–1830: John Fane, Lord Burghersh

Ministers Resident
1830–1835: Sir George Seymour
1835–1838: Hon. Ralph Abercromby

Envoy Extraordinary and Minister Plenipotentiary to the Grand Duke of Tuscany
1838–1846: Hon. Henry Fox
1846–1850: Sir George Hamilton
1850–1851: Richard Sheil
1851–1852: James Hudson
1852–1854: Sir Henry Bulwer
1854–1858: Constantine Phipps, 1st Marquess of Normanby
1858: Henry Howard (pro tempore)
1858: Richard Lyons
Dec 1858–1859: Peter Campbell Scarlett

In 1858, the Grand Duchy was occupied by Sardinia and abolished in 1859

See also
 Grand Duchy of Tuscany
 History of Tuscany
 List of rulers of Tuscany
 Tuscany

References

Tuscany
United Kingdom to Tuscany